The Courtauld Institute of Art, commonly referred to as The Courtauld, is a self-governing college of the University of London specialising in the study of the history of art and conservation. It is among the most prestigious specialist colleges for the study of the history of art in the world and is known for the disproportionate number of directors of major museums drawn from its small body of alumni.

The art collection is known particularly for its French Impressionist and Post-Impressionist paintings and is housed in the Courtauld Gallery. The Courtauld is based in Somerset House, in the Strand in London. In 2019, The Courtauld's teaching and research activities temporarily relocated to Vernon Square, London, while its Somerset House site underwent a major regeneration project.

History
The Courtauld was founded in 1932 through the philanthropic efforts of the industrialist and art collector Samuel Courtauld, the diplomat and collector Lord Lee of Fareham, and the art historian Sir Robert Witt.

Originally The Courtauld was based in Home House, a Robert Adam-designed townhouse in London's Portman Square. The Strand block of Somerset House, designed by William Chambers from 1775 to 1780, has housed The Courtauld since 1989.

The Courtauld has been an independent college of the University of London since 2002.

The Courtauld has featured several times on the BBC's arts programme Fake or Fortune. In April 2020, during the COVID-19 pandemic, the Institute offered digital "mini festivals" called "Open Courtauld Hour".

Academic profile
The Courtauld Institute of Art is the major centre for the study of the history and conservation of art and architecture in the United Kingdom. It offers undergraduate and postgraduate teaching to around 400 students each year. Degrees are awarded by the University of London.

The Courtauld was ranked first in the United Kingdom for History and History of Art in The Guardians 2011 University Guide and was confirmed in this rank for research quality in the 2014 Research Excellence Framework. The Independent has called it "probably the most prestigious specialist college for the study of the history of art in the world."

The Courtauld was ranked, again, first in the United Kingdom for History and History of Art in The Guardians 2017 University Guide.

Research
According to the 2014 Research Excellence Framework, The Courtauld hosts the highest proportion of the UK's world-leading and internationally excellent research among all higher education institutions with 95% of research rated in the top two categories (4*/3*), 56% of which was rated in the 4* category, tied for highest in the UK with London Business School.

Undergraduate study
The only undergraduate course offered by The Courtauld is a BA in the History of Art. This is a full-time course designed to introduce students to all aspects of the study of art history.

Postgraduate study
Several taught courses are offered at postgraduate level: master's degrees in history of art, curating the art museum, the history of Buddhist art, and the conservation of wall painting are taught alongside diploma courses in the conservation of easel paintings and the history of art. Students in the history of art master's programme have to choose a specialisation ranging from antiquity to early modern to global contemporary artwork. Special options are taught in small class sizes of 5–10 students.

Study resources
The Courtauld has two photographic libraries which originated as the private collections of two benefactors: the Conway Library, covering architecture, architectural drawings, sculpture and illuminated manuscripts, named after the Lord Conway of Allington and the Witt Library, after Sir Robert Witt, covering paintings, drawings and engravings and containing over two million reproductions of works by over 70,000 artists. In 2009, it was decided that the Witt Library would not continue to add new material to the collection, and in 2017 a mass digitisation project which will make both Witt and Conway items available online commenced as part of Courtauld Connects.

The book library is one of the UK's largest holdings of art history books, periodicals and exhibition catalogues. There is a slide library which also covers films, and an IT suite.

An online image collection provides access to more than 40,000 images, including paintings and drawings from The Courtauld Gallery, and over 35,000 photographs of architecture and sculpture from the Conway Library. Two other websites sell high resolution digital files to scholars, publishers and broadcasters, and photographic prints to a wide public audience.

The Courtauld uses a virtual learning environment to deliver course material to its students. Since 2004, The Courtauld has published an annual research journal, Immediations, edited by current members of the research student body. Each cover of the journal has been commissioned by a leading contemporary artist. Additionally, together with the Warburg Institute, the institute publishes The Journal of the Warburg and Courtauld Institutes, an annual publication of about 300 pages.

The Courtauld Gallery

The Courtauld's art collection is housed in The Courtauld Gallery. The collection was begun by the founder of The Courtauld, Samuel Courtauld, who presented an extensive collection of mainly French Impressionist and Post-Impressionist paintings in 1932. It was enhanced by further gifts in the 1930s and a bequest in 1948, and has since received many significant donations and bequests. The Gallery contains some 530 paintings and over 26,000 drawings and prints.

The Courtauld Gallery is open to the public, having closed temporarily on 3 September 2018 until 19 November 2021 for a major redevelopment Since 1989 it has been housed in the Strand block of Somerset House, which was the first home of the Royal Academy, founded in 1768. In April 2013 the Head of the Courtauld Gallery was Ernst Vegelin.

Notable people associated with The Courtauld

The Courtauld is well known for its many graduates who have become directors of art museums around the world. These include the Metropolitan Museum of Art, New York; the Museum of Modern Art, New York; the National Gallery, London; the National Portrait Gallery, London; the British Museum, London; the Tate, London; the Fine Arts Museums of San Francisco, San Francisco; the National Gallery of Art, Washington; and the Museo del Prado, Madrid. The number of notable alumni in the fine arts has earned graduates the "Courtauld Mafia" nickname.

Directors
The directors of The Courtauld have been:

References

External links

 

 
Museums of the University of London
Educational institutions established in 1932
1932 establishments in England
Photo archives in the United Kingdom
1932 in art
Education in the City of Westminster
Museums in the City of Westminster
Arts organizations established in 1932
Strand, London
Courtauld